Bealls Inc.  is an American retail corporation with headquarters located in Bradenton, Florida, since its founding in 1915, the family-owned corporation now operates more than 650 stores under the names of Bealls, Bealls Outlet, Burkes Outlet, and Home Centric. The CEO of Bealls Inc. is Matt Beall. 

Bealls Florida was not affiliated with the Texas-based Bealls chain formerly owned by Stage Stores, although the two overlapped in some markets. (Bealls Outlet used the Burkes Outlet name where there was overlap.) However, on October 21, 2020, Bealls bought Stage's intellectual property for $7 million, as part of Stage's winding-down of its operations after that company filed for Chapter 11 bankruptcy in May of that year. In doing so, the Florida chain acquired the rights to use the Bealls name nationwide; previously, it was only able to use the name in Florida, Georgia, and Arizona. Bealls also acquired the rights to the Stage, Gordmans, Goody's, Palais Royal and Peebles names, all of Stage's private label brands and customer lists, and a distribution center in Jacksonville, Texas.

History
In 1915, 22-year-old Robert M. Beall Sr. opened a dry goods store in Bradenton, Florida. Investing his entire savings in merchandise, he used empty wooden packing crates as his first display tables.  Because the store sold nothing for more than one dollar he called his store The Dollar Limit. Following World War I inflation, in 1920 Beall renamed his store V-Dollar Limit Store to reflect that maximum prices were pushed up to five dollars. Business prospered during the Florida land boom of the 1920s; in a few years Beall purchased a vacant lot facing the courthouse and erected a new modern department store, which opened for Christmas, 1924. The Florida boom ended in a few years, only to be followed by the stock market crash.  Hard hit and unable to pay his debts, Robert Beall lost his business to the bank. He stayed on as manager through the depression.  By 1944 he had saved enough to repurchase it.

Bealls Stores

In 1946, Robert was joined by his son E.R. as junior partner.  They christened the business Bealls Department Store. Air conditioning and an influx of new residents in the 1950s began to transform the face of Florida. In 1957, the second Bealls Department store was opened in Bradenton's Westgate Shopping Center and a third store followed in 1961 at the Venice Shopping Center in Venice, Florida.  E.R. developed the new chain while his father ran the original downtown store until just prior to his death in 1979.

During the 1960s and 1970s Florida experienced amazing growth and Bealls stores grew with it. In 1980, Robert M. Beall II became president of the corporation—the third generation. E.R. became chairman of the board.  By 1981 the chain had 23 stores. A year later, seven new stores enabled the chain to double its selling space. Bealls continued to grow into new communities and adopt new technologies, introducing in-store kiosks and launching their website in 1998. Bealls' growth philosophy was to self-finance; staying within the limits of its operating cash, and keeping its debt load low. To customize its product line, Bealls opened its own design studio in 2004. Lines exclusive to Bealls include Reel Legends, Coral Bay, and Leoma Lovegrove.

Bealls Outlet

E.R. Beall having observed the growth of outlet stores in North Carolina, Bealls ventured into the off-price channel in 1987.  After a few hits and misses, Bealls Outlet caught on rapidly. A new buying organization was created, constantly shopping the markets for great finds. In 1992, Bealls opened its first out-of-Florida Outlet in Arizona, and soon expanded to Georgia. Today Bealls Outlet numbers more than 420 stores in 16 states across the Sunbelt under the names of Bealls Outlet and Burkes Outlet.  The Burkes Outlet name is used in Alabama, Arkansas, Kentucky, Indiana, Louisiana, Mississippi, Nevada, New Mexico, North Carolina, West Virginia, Virginia, South Carolina, Tennessee, and Texas.  Online outlet shopping began with the debut of http://www.Burkesoutlet.com in 2014.  Bealls and Burkes Outlet stores follow a deep discount every day low price policy with an emphasis on branded merchandise.

Home Centric
The Home Centric brand of stores began as a store within a store test concept in select Burkes Outlet and Bealls Outlet stores. The first stand-alone Home Centric store opened in May 2018 in Cary, NC focusing on discount home furnishings and home decor. Home Centric is dedicated to bringing its customers "inspired living for less" maintaining the focus on discounted pricing established by the Burkes Outlet and Bealls Outlet brands.

Community 
Following the sale of the old downtown store, the proceeds were used to establish a charitable foundation named for the founder.  Since then the foundation has provided scholarships to over 600 employees and their dependents. Bealls is a longtime contributor to the United Way and to agencies that help young people and education. In celebration of its centennial year, company outreach assisted Habitat for Humanity and the American Cancer Society; Bealls also sponsors Take Stock in Children, helping to mentor at-risk children throughout Florida.

References

External links
Bealls Inc. website
Bealls Florida retail website
Bealls Outlet website
Burke's Outlet website
Bunulu website
Home Centric website
Rugged Earth Outfitters
Reel Legends

1915 establishments in Florida
Retail companies established in 1915
Companies based in Manatee County, Florida
Bradenton, Florida
Department stores of the United States
Family-owned companies of the United States